Dillwynella planorbis is a species of sea snail, a marine gastropod mollusk in the family Skeneidae.

Description
The genus Dillwynella is a classification of various sea snails that Dillwynella Planorbis belongs to. Being a mollusk, the normal height of the shell attains 3 mm and contains various whirls.

Distribution
This marine species occurs off Japan.

References

Higo, S., Callomon, P. & Goto, Y. (1999). Catalogue and bibliography of the marine shell-bearing Mollusca of Japan. Osaka. : Elle Scientific Publications. 749 pp.

External links
 To GenBank (3 nucleotides; 2 proteins)
 To World Register of Marine Species

planorbis
Gastropods described in 1997